Sunday at the Speedway is an album by punk rock band Alien Father.

Released in February 2010 on Ourselves Collective, a donation-based label, Sunday at the Speedway is available to download for free. The cover art image is sourced from the 1955 Le Mans disaster.

Track listing
"Bed In"  – 3:08
"Chinga Tu Madre"  – 2:32
"Giants"  – 3:37
"Hellbound Homo"  – 3:14
"He's A Fader"  - 1:29
"Incest People"  – 2:17
"The Misanthropes"  – 3:16
"CT"  – 2:18
"Way Out West"  – 2:34
"Cloudsong"  – 2:12

Album personnel
Dave Hallinger – vocals, guitar, bass
Curtis Regian – vocals, synth, piano, bass
Mike Topley – drums

References

External links 
 Sons of Brothas

2010 albums
Alien Father albums